The 2009 Women's Cricket World Cup squads consisted of 119 players from eight national women's cricket teams. Organised by the International Cricket Council (ICC), the 2009 Women's Cricket World Cup, held in Australia, was the ninth edition of the competition. England won the tournament for the second time, defeating New Zealand by four wickets in the final.

Each team selected a squad of up to 15 players, and any changes to that squad due to illness or injury had to be requested in writing and approved by the ICC's Event Technical Committee. Three such replacements were made to the squads, with South Africa, Sri Lanka and the West Indies making a change. England entered the tournament with the top-ranked players in both the ICC's batting and bowling rankings, Claire Taylor and Isa Guha respectively, but Australia were commonly listed in the press as favourites to win the tournament. Taylor finished the tournament as the leading run-scorer, accumulating 324 runs, and her England teammate Laura Marsh was the most prolific wicket-taker, claiming 16 wickets.

At the conclusion of the tournament, an ICC panel selected their team of the tournament. The player of the tournament, England's Claire Taylor, was one of five English players, along with Katherine Brunt, Marsh, Sarah Taylor, and Charlotte Edwards, the last of whom was chosen as the team's captain. Finalists New Zealand had two representatives—Suzie Bates and Kate Pulford, and in addition, Sophie Devine was selected as the twelfth player. Three Indians were included—Mithali Raj, Amita Sharma and Priyanka Roy—as was Shelley Nitschke of Australia.

Key

Australia

England

India

New Zealand

Pakistan

South Africa

Sri Lanka

West Indies

References

Women's Cricket World Cup squads
squads